State Route 7 (SR 7), formerly known as Inter-county Highway 7 until 1921 and State Highway 7 in 1922, is a north–south state highway in the southern and eastern portions of the U.S. state of Ohio. Its southern terminus is an interchange with U.S. Route 52 (US 52) just west of Chesapeake. Its northern terminus also serves as the eastern terminus of SR 531 in Conneaut. The path of SR 7 stays within  of the Ohio River (Ohio's border with West Virginia) for the southern portion, with the river being visible from much of the route. The road also remains within  of the Pennsylvania state line for the northern portion.

Route description

This portion of the highway encounters routes like US 35, US 33, US 50, and Interstate 77 (I-77). It passes through many Ohio River towns like Marietta, Bellaire, and Steubenville. Once it reaches the Pennsylvania border it heads north along SR 11 & US 30 from East Liverpool to Rogers. After it exits State Route 11 in Rogers the route turns north and starts tracking toward Youngstown.

Upon reaching the junction with the Ohio Turnpike, OH SR 7 enters the Connecticut Western Reserve. Continuing north, it becomes Market Street in Boardman, Ohio, with a significant suburban increase. Then the highway heads east overlapped with US 62. After that shared alignment, the highway then heads north again in Hubbard through many small towns to its northern terminus with SR 531 in Conneaut.

History
In 1912, Intercounty Highway 7 ran along the Ohio River, from Elizabethtown to the Pennsylvania state line in East Liverpool.

In 1923, the route was at its greatest extent, the northern terminus of the route was extended from East Liverpool to Conneaut.

In 1927, the route's southern terminus was truncated from the Indiana state line to Chesapeake to make way for US 52 and a small segment of US 50

A tunnel was constructed north of Stratton in 1982. The $27 million project was necessitated for the expansion of the W. H. Sammis Power Plant.

Chesapeake and Proctorville bypass

The Chesapeake bypass was first proposed in 1953.

In 1961, the US 52 expressway opened from Chesapeake westward towards Sheridan. The original eastern terminus of the four-lane divided highway was at the current Chesapeake northbound-only exit ramp east of Tallow Ridge Road. US 52 originally crossed at the present-day Robert C. Byrd Bridge that connects Chesapeake to Huntington, West Virginia. In 1979, the US 52 designation moved to the Nick Joe Rahall II Bridge as tolls on that span were removed that year; the segment east of the Rahall Bridge to the Chesapeake interchange was renumbered to SR 7.

Ten years later, the four-lane expressway was extended eastward to an incomplete trumpet interchange just east of Big Branch Road. A four-lane connector route from the partially complete interchange to the foot of the Robert C. Byrd Bridge at SR  527 was completed. At the same time, the two-lane Chesapeake interchange ramp just east of Tallow Ridge Road was converted to a northbound-only exit ramp. The abrupt terminus at Chesapeake was envisioned to connect to Proctorville. Though the portion of SR 527 is signed as part of SR 7, it is not officially part of the route and many signs show this portion of SR 527 as "To SR 7."

On May 31, 2002, ground was broken for Phase 1-A of the Proctorville bypass. Phase 1-A entailed a two-lane connector road from the East Huntington Bridge to Irene Road, with the original loop ramp from the bridge to State Route 7 being modified into an access road. Phase 1-B was designated from Irene Road to State Route 7 near Fairland East Elementary in Rome Township. Phase 2 was envisioned from Irene Road west to Chesapeake. The total cost was originally estimated to be at $165 million.

On April 27, 2003, Phase 1-A of the Proctorville bypass opened to traffic. The $6.5 million,  section of three-lane roadway was opened from the foot of the East Huntington Bridge to Irene Road and signed as SR 607.

On June 3, 2003, bids were opened for Phase 1-B from Irene Road to SR 7 near Fairland East Elementary. The projected cost of the  segment was originally $27 million, however, when the bids were let, the cost had decreased to $24.3 million. The lowest bid, which was also accepted, came in at $22.1 million. The road was designed as a two-lane limited-access facility on a four-lane right-of-way. Construction began on August 4, with an original estimated completion date of June 30, 2005.

An unusual amount of rain, blamed on two hurricanes, caused major delays. More than one-dozen major slips along Phase 1-B required an additional $30 million in repairs and the purchase of additional land for highwall excavations. Another change was the design of the roadway; originally projected to be widened in the future when higher traffic counts warrant the expansion, it was designed on wide right-of-way with no grade separation between the opposing lanes. During the repair of the slips, a terraced roadway was constructed to separate the future southbound lanes from the northbound by a highwall when the roadway is expanded to four lanes.

Other cost overruns had pushed the cost of construction to $62 million total, which included Phases 1-A and 1-B, up from the original estimates of $32 million. The primary cause was rapidly increasing land values and "unchecked zoning" along the project's projected right-of-way along with geo-technical problems with rocky soil. Property values along the projected route, for instance, increased 91.5% from 1992 to 2001 alone.

In October 2006, a small  segment of the Phase 1-B bypass opened to traffic between SR 607 and Irene Road intersection to SR 775. The remainder, east to SR 7 near Fairland East Elementary, opened on December 8, 2006. It includes intersections with SR 775, Kinley Avenue, and SR 7. Upon completion, phases 1-A and 1-B were signed as SR 7; the bypass from the SR 775 junction to the loop at the East Huntington Bridge was co-numbered with SR 775.

Phase 2 of the bypass, from the Chesapeake bypass to Irene Road at Proctorville, has not been funded.  Funding which had been previously promised by the Ohio Department of Transportation (ODOT) was later denied. Phase 2 is estimated to cost $76 million to complete. Also due to the construction delays (slips) on the bypass from SR 775 to Fairland East Elementary School (Phase 1-B), the design of Phase 2 may be realigned to prevent slips during construction.

Pomeroy Bypass
The Pomeroy bypass from Middleport east to US 33 was completed in 1968.  At the time of completion, the bypass was two lanes but was upgraded to four lanes, divided, in 1976 from SR 143 to US 33 near Rock Springs. The bypass was extended east in 2000 from Rock Springs to a partial diamond interchange with SR 7 as a four-lane divided expressway.  It was initially signed just SR 7.  The diamond interchange was later completed with all connections, and the highway was extended eastward to Ravenswood, West Virginia as US 33.

Major intersections

Auxiliary routes

State Route 7 Alternate in Bridgeport

State Route 7 Alternate (SR 7A) is a short  connecting loop signed as SR 7 that serves as a link from SR 7, US 40, and US 250 to I-70 in Bridgeport. Its western (southern) terminus is at SR 767, and its eastern (northern) terminus is along US 40 at its intersection with US 250 and the northern terminus of SR 767. SR 7A begins at the intersections of Howard Street and SR 767 (South Lincoln Avenue). SR 7A continues west as Howard Street until it intersects Marion Street. It then runs north as Marion Street, intersects I-70, and then intersects US 40, Main Street.

State Route 767

State Route 767 (SR 767) is an unsigned north–south state highway in the eastern portion of the U.S. state of Ohio. Currently, it is signed as an alternate route of SR 7. Its southern terminus is at an exit ramp on SR 7 in Bridgeport.  The route serves as a connector from northbound SR 7 to SR 7 Alternate, US 40, and US 250.  The route's northern terminus is where these U.S. routes overlap eastbound to cross the Ohio River into West Virginia.  SR 7A serves as a connector for all of these routes to I-70.

Business State Route 7 from Middleport to Pomeroy

The route followed the former alignment of State Route 7 that was replaced by the Pomeroy Bypass, and ran through the downtown areas of Middleport and Pomeroy. The route was deleted between 2013 and 2015.

Route 7T

State Route 7T (SR 7T) was a  future route beginning at US 62 in Youngstown. The entire route was concurrent with US 62T. SR 7T and US 62T were removed on May 2, 2007.

See also

References

External links

007
Transportation in Ashtabula County, Ohio
Transportation in Athens County, Ohio
Transportation in Belmont County, Ohio
Transportation in Columbiana County, Ohio
Transportation in Gallia County, Ohio
Transportation in Jefferson County, Ohio
Transportation in Lawrence County, Ohio
Transportation in Mahoning County, Ohio
Transportation in Meigs County, Ohio
Transportation in Monroe County, Ohio
Transportation in Trumbull County, Ohio
Transportation in Washington County, Ohio